Zahira College is a public school in Hambantota, Sri Lanka. It was founded in 1911 by Leonard Woolf and its first principal and teacher was Rathna Sabapathi.

History
The school was founded as Tamil Mixed School on 23 January 1911, by Leonard Woolf, who was at the time the Assistant Government Agent of Hambantota District. It was the first Tamil medium school in the district and had only one teacher.

On 1 October 1914, the school's name was changed to the Government Tamil Mixed School. At this point there were 50 students and one teacher.

In 2004, the school building was destroyed by the Indian Ocean tsunami and was rebuilt with the aid of UNICEF.

Partnerships
The college has partnered with Ermysted's Grammar School in England to collaborate in curricula such as environmental studies, geography, information technology, PSHCE, and art.

Past principals

References

External links
Official Zahira College Hambantoa Facebook Fan Page
Ermysted's and Zahira College Global Partnership
THE ZONAL EDUCATION OFFICE – HAMBANTOTA
Address
Adsress 2

Educational institutions established in 1911
Buildings and structures in Hambantota
Schools in Hambantota District
1911 establishments in Ceylon